Ma. Subramanian is an Indian Tamil lawyer, businessman and politician. He serves as a Minister for Health and Family Welfare of Tamil Nadu since 7 May 2021. He served as Mayor of Chennai from 2006 to 2011, the capital of the Indian state of Tamil Nadu. He is a member of the Dravida Munnetra Kazhagam (DMK) party. He is a lawyer by profession.

Early life 

Subramanian completed his higher education in Saidapet Government Model Higher Secondary School and his bachelor's degree in an Open University course. He did his LLB from Havanur College of Law at Bangalore.

Career

He joined the DMK in 1976 and became the chairman of Chennai Corporation during 1996–2006. He was elected mayor of Chennai in 2006. He is DMK's youth wing deputy general secretary and loyal to M K Stalin.

He became a practicing advocate in the Madras High Court in 1999. He is a member of Tamil Nadu Legislative Assembly, elected from Saidapet assembly constituency in the 2021 election. He contested and won against former Chennai mayor Saidai Duraisamy.

As health minister 
In 2021 he was appointed minister for Health and Family Welfare of Tamil Nadu.

In July 2021, Subramanian gave his MLA hostel and a month's supply of groceries to the couple who work as daily wagers to treat their daughter who ate bleaching powder by mistaking it for milk powder in March 2021 and lost weight gradually.

Electoral performance

References

External links
Personal website 

1959 births
Living people
Dravida Munnetra Kazhagam politicians
Mayors of Chennai
Tamil Nadu MLAs 2016–2021
Tamil Nadu MLAs 2021–2026